The Epistle of Jude is the penultimate book of the New Testament as well as the Christian Bible. It is traditionally attributed to Jude, brother of James the Just, and thus relative of Jesus as well.

Jude is a short epistle written in Koine Greek.  It condemns in fierce terms certain people the author sees as a threat to the early Christian community, but describes these opponents only vaguely.  According to Jude, these opponents are within the Christian community, but are not true Christians: they are scoffers, false teachers, malcontents, given to their lusts, and so on.  The epistle reassures its readers that these people will soon be judged by God.  It is possible that the group being referred to would have been obvious to the original recipients of the letter, but if a specific group was being referred to, knowledge of the details has since been lost.  The one bit of their potential ideology discussed in the letter is that these opponents denigrate angels and their role.  If this was indeed a part of the ideology of this group the author opposed, then the epistle is possibly a counterpoint to the Epistle to the Colossians.  Colossians condemns those who give angels undue prominence and worship them; this implies the two letters might be part of an early Christian debate on Christian angelology.

Authorship
The epistle introduces itself with a simple claim of authorship: "Jude, a servant of Jesus Christ and brother of James" (NRSV). "James" is generally taken to mean James, brother of Jesus, a prominent leader in the early church.  Introductions would typically refer to a father in the era, so the use of a brother suggests that this would only be done if the brother was famous within the community.  Little is known about Jude himself.  As the brother of James, it has traditionally meant Jude was also a brother of Jesus, since James is described as being the brother of Jesus. This is why Clement of Alexandria (c. 150–215 AD) wrote in his work "Comments on the Epistle of Jude" that Jude, the author, was a son of Joseph and a brother of Jesus.  However, there is a dispute as to whether "brother" means someone who has the same father and mother, or a half-brother, cousin, or more distant familial relationship. This dispute over the true meaning of "brother" grew as the doctrine of the Virgin Birth evolved.  For example, Saint Jerome believed that not only Mary but also Joseph were virgins their entire lives, and thus James and by extension Jude were cousins.

Outside the book of Jude, a "Jude" is mentioned five times in the New Testament: three times as Jude the Apostle, and twice as Jude the brother of Jesus (aside from references to Judas Iscariot and Judah (son of Jacob)). Debate continues as to whether the author of the epistle is the apostle, the brother of Jesus, both, or neither. Scholars have argued that since the author of the letter has not identified himself as an apostle and also refers to the apostles as a third party, and thus cannot be identified with Jude the Apostle. Other scholars have drawn the opposite conclusion, which is that, as an apostle, he would not have made a claim of apostleship on his own behalf.

A reason to doubt that a relative of Jesus wrote the book is that they are unlikely to have been literate.  Jesus's family were common laborers from Aramaic-speaking Galilee, and literary composition skills were overwhelmingly concentrated in the elite in antiquity.  Few knew how to read, fewer how to write, and fewer still how to write complicated literary treatises.  Jesus himself may have been able to read, presumably in Hebrew, but he was also exceptional and the star of the family.  Even if somehow Jude had learned a little of how to read Hebrew, the epistle is written in excellent, complicated Koine Greek, with knowledge of common forms of rhetoric and argument of the era, as well as seeming knowledge of the scriptures in Hebrew.  All this would be exceptional for a countryside Galilean.  Scholars who support the authorship of Jude generally assume that he must have embarked upon extensive travel and missionary work among Hellenized Jews to master Greek as the author did.  Ultimately, it is impossible to know more details of Jude's life for sure.  One early Christian tradition states that Jude's grandchildren were brought before Emperor Domitian and interrogated; in the story, they defended themselves as not rebels and mere poor laborers eking out what they could from a single patch of land.  While the story is clearly apocryphal – Roman emperors did not generally interrogate Galilean peasants – it does suggest that early Christians remembered Jude's family as lower-class laborers, not literate elites.

If the Jude writing the letter was not Jude the Apostle mentioned in the gospels, then he was possibly an unknown Christian who happened to share the name and coincidentally also had a brother named James.  A final possibility is that the epistle is pseudepigrapha – that the author intentionally hinted to readers that it was from the more famous Jude, but only as a false attribution to give the letter more authority.

Date
The date of composition is not known, but is loosely speculated to be between the years 50 and 110.  Among those who favor the authorship of the Jude mentioned in the gospels, the letter is generally placed before the destruction of the Temple in Jerusalem in 70 AD. Among those who favor the authorship of an unknown Christian, it is assumed to be a work of the early second century.  Scholars who consider the letter a pseudonymous work generally favor the later dates due to the letter's references to the apostles (as if they lived in the past) and to tradition and because of its competent Greek style.  Bo Reicke suggests around 90 AD; Heikki Räisänen concurs and believes that it may have been written at the end of the first century.  Bart Ehrman suggests an even later date, in the second half of the second century, due to use of certain terminology in ways similar to the pastoral epistles that was uncommon in the first century.

Content
Jude urges his readers to "contend for the faith" against "certain intruders [who] have stolen in among you."  He warns about false teachers who twist the grace of Christ as a pretext for wantonness.  Jude asks the reader to recall how even after the Lord saved his own people out of the land of Egypt, he did not hesitate to destroy those who fell into unbelief, much as he punished the angels who fell from their original exalted status and the inhabitants of Sodom and Gomorrah.   He also paraphrases (verse 9) an incident apparently from the Testament of Moses that has since been lost about Satan and Michael the Archangel quarreling over the body of Moses.

Continuing the analogy from Israel's history, he says that the false teachers have followed in the way of Cain, have rushed after reward into the error of Balaam, and have perished in the rebellion of Korach.  He describes in vivid terms the opponents he warns of, calling them "clouds without rain", "trees without fruit", "foaming waves of the sea", and "wandering stars". He exhorts believers to remember the words spoken by the Apostles, using language similar to the second epistle of Peter to answer concerns that the Lord seemed to tarry: "In the last time there will be scoffers, indulging their own ungodly lusts," and to keep themselves in God's love, before delivering a doxology to God.

Jude quotes directly from 1 Enoch, a widely distributed work among the Old Testament Pseudepigrapha, citing a section of 1 Enoch 1:8 that is based on Deuteronomy 33:2.

Style and audience
The Epistle of Jude is one of the shortest books of the New Testament, consisting of just 1 chapter with 25 verses, and almost the shortest book in the Bible. It may have been composed as an encyclical letter—that is, one not directed to the members of one church in particular, but intended rather to be circulated and read in all churches.  While addressed to the Christian Church as a whole, the reference to the Old Testament figures such as Michael, Cain, and Korah's sons; the Book of Enoch quotation; and the invocation of James, the head of the church of Jerusalem, suggests a Jewish Christian main audience that would be familiar with Enochian literature and revere James.

The wording and syntax of this epistle in its original Greek demonstrates that the author was capable and fluent.  The epistle's style is combative, impassioned, and rushed. Many examples of evildoers and warnings about their fates are given in rapid succession.

The epistle concludes with a doxology, which is considered by Peter H. Davids to be one of the highest in quality contained in the Bible.

Canonical status
The letter of Jude was one of the disputed books of the biblical canon of the New Testament.  Despite some opposition, it seems to have been accepted by most churches around the end of the second century. Clement of Alexandria, Tertullian, and the Muratorian canon considered the letter canonical.  The letter was eventually accepted as part of the canon by later Church Fathers such as Athanasius of Alexandria.  The canon list at the Council of Carthage (c. 397) included the epistle of Jude.  

The first historical record of doubts as to authorship are found in the writings of Origen of Alexandria, who spoke of the doubts held by some in the early third century. Eusebius classified it with the "disputed writings, the antilegomena" in the early fourth century.  Eusebius doubted its authenticity partially because it was rarely quoted among ancient sources, although he acknowledges it was read in many churches. The links between the Epistle and 2 Peter and its use of the biblical apocrypha raised concern: Saint Jerome wrote in 392 AD that the book was "rejected by many" since it quotes the Book of Enoch.

Surviving early manuscripts

Early manuscripts containing the text of the epistle of Jude include:
Papyrus 72 (3rd/4th century)
Papyrus 78 (3rd/4th century; extant verses 4–5, 7–8)
Codex Vaticanus (B or 03; 325–350)
Codex Sinaiticus ( or 01; 330–360)
Codex Alexandrinus (A or 02; 400–440)
Codex Ephraemi Rescriptus (C or 04; c. 450; extant verses 3–25)

Identity of the opponents
The epistle fiercely condemns the opponents it warns of and declares that God will judge and punish them, despite them being a part of the Christian community.  However, the exact nature of these opponents has been a continuing interest for both theologians and historians, as the epistle does not describe them in any more detail than calling them corrupt and ungodly.  Several theories have been proposed.  The most specific verse describing the opponents is verse 8:

Reject "authority" (κυριοτητα, kyriotēta; alternate translations include "dominion" or "lordship") could mean several things.  The most direct would be rejection of civil or ecclesiastical authority: the opponents were ignoring guidance from leaders.  Martin Luther and Jean Calvin agreed with this interpretation, and it is the most common one.  Another possibility is that this specifically referred to rejecting the authority of Jesus or God, which would agree with verse 4 and be reinforcing the claim that these opponents are not true Christians.  A third possibility is that this is the singular of kyriotētes (Dominions), a class of angels.  This would fit with the final part of the sentence of "heap abuse on celestial beings", but it is unusual that the singular is used.  Versions of Jude vary, and some manuscripts such as the Codex Sinaiticus indeed use the plural form, though.

"Heap abuse on celestial beings" is also a relevant statement, as it stands in some tension with the works of Paul the Apostle as well as the Epistle to the Hebrews.  Paul's undisputed works indicate that believers are already on the same level as angels, that all existing powers are subject to Christ, and believers are the future judges of angels.  Later writings attributed to Paul such as Colossians and Ephesians go even further, with Colossians decrying the alleged worship of angels.  A hypothesis is thus that the author may have been attacking forms of Pauline Christianity that were not suitably deferential to angels in their opinion.  "Rejecting authority" may be a reference to Paul's preaching that gentiles did not need to comply with Jewish Law.  As James was known to be a major figure among Jewish Christians, this might indicate tension between the more Jewish strands of early Christianity represented by James and Jude set against Paul's message to the gentiles.  However, the line about "heap abuse on celestial beings" might have essentially been just another insult, in which case this entire line of thought is rendered moot.  

The inherent vagueness of the epistle means that the identities of these opponents may well never be known.

Similarity to 2 Peter

Part of Jude is very similar to 2 Peter (mainly 2 Peter chapter 2); so much so that most scholars agree that either one letter used the other directly, or they both drew on a common source. Comparing the Greek text portions of 2 Peter 2:1–3:3 (426 words) to Jude 4–18 (311 words) results in 80 words in common and 7 words of substituted synonyms.

Because this epistle is much shorter than 2 Peter, and due to various stylistic details, some scholars consider Jude the source for the similar passages of 2 Peter. However, other writers, arguing that Jude 18 quotes 2 Peter 3:3 as past tense, consider Jude to have come after 2 Peter.

Some scholars who consider Jude to predate 2 Peter note that the latter appears to quote the former but omits the reference to the non-canonical book of Enoch.

References to other books

The Epistle of Jude references at least three other books, with two (Book of Zechariah & 2 Peter) being canonical in all churches and the other (Book of Enoch) non-canonical in most churches.

Verse 9 refers to a dispute between Michael the Archangel and the devil about the body of Moses. Some interpreters understand this reference to be an allusion to the events described in Zechariah 3:1–2. The classical theologian Origen, as well as Clement of Alexandria, Didymus the Blind, and others, attributes this reference to the non-canonical Assumption of Moses.  However, no extant copies of the Assumption of Moses contain this story, leading most scholars to conclude the section covering this dispute has been lost – perhaps a lost ending, since a story involving Moses's body would logically occur at the end.  Some scholars disagree; James Charlesworth argues that the Assumption of Moses never contained any such content, and other ancient Church writers supported a different origin.

Verses 14–15 contain a direct quotation of a prophecy from 1 Enoch 1:9. The title "Enoch, the seventh from Adam" is also sourced from 1 En. 60:1. Most commentators assume that this indicates that Jude accepts the antediluvian patriarch Enoch as the author of the Book of Enoch which contains the same quotation.  An alternative explanation is that Jude quotes the Book of Enoch aware that verses 14–15 are an expansion of the words of Moses from Deuteronomy 33:2.

The Book of Enoch is not considered canonical by most churches, although it is by the Ethiopian Orthodox church.  According to Western scholars, the older sections of the Book of Enoch (mainly in the Book of the Watchers) date from about 300 BC and the latest part (Book of Parables) probably was composed at the end of the 1st century BC. 1 Enoch 1:9, mentioned above, is part of the pseudepigrapha and is among the Dead Sea Scrolls [4Q Enoch (4Q204[4QENAR]) COL I 16–18]. It is largely accepted by scholars that the author of the Epistle of Jude was familiar with the Book of Enoch and was influenced by it in thought and diction.

The epistle also closely mirrors the Epistle of James, with many similar sentences and borrowed phrases.

See also
 Textual variants in the Epistle of Jude

Notes

References

Bibliography

Further reading

External links

Online translations of the Epistle of Jude:
 Online Bible at GospelHall.org
 Jude at Bible Gateway (various versions)
 Early Christian writings: Epistle of Jude: comparable translations and interpretations
Audiobook Version:
 

Additional information:
 Catholic Encyclopedia
 Comprehensive study the Epistle of Jude
 An Exegesis of Jude by Michael Quandt
 BibleProject Animated Overview (evangelical perspective)

 
Antilegomena
Jude
Luther's Antilegomena
Jude
Jude, brother of Jesus